Miernów  is a village in the administrative district of Gmina Złota, within Pińczów County, Świętokrzyskie Voivodeship, in south-central Poland.

The village has an approximate population of 330.

References

Villages in Pińczów County